Structural violence is a form of violence wherein some social structure or social institution may harm people by preventing them from meeting their basic needs.

The term was coined by Norwegian sociologist Johan Galtung, who introduced it in his 1969 article "Violence, Peace, and Peace Research". Some examples of structural violence as proposed by Galtung include institutionalized racism, sexism, and classism, among others. Structural violence and direct violence are said to be highly interdependent, including family violence, gender violence, hate crimes, racial violence, police violence, state violence, terrorism, and war. It is very closely linked to social injustice insofar as it affects people differently in various social structures.

Definitions

Galtung 
According to Johan Galtung, rather than conveying a physical image, structural violence is an "avoidable impairment of fundamental human needs."

Galtung contrasts structural violence with "classical violence:" violence that is "direct," characterized by rudimentary, impermanent "bodily destruction" committed by some actor. Galtung places this as the first category of violence. In this sense, the purest form of structural violence can be understood as violence that endures with no particular beginning, and that lacks an 'actor' to have committed it.

Following this, by excluding the requirement of an identifiable actor from the classical definition of violence, Galtung lists poverty (i.e., the "deprival of basic human needs") as the second category of violence and "structurally conditioned poverty" as the first category of structural violence.

Asking why violence necessarily needs to be done to the human body for it to be considered violence—"why not also include violence done to the human mind, psyche or how one wants to express it"—Galtung proceeds to repression (i.e., the "deprival of human rights") as the third category of violence, and "structurally conditioned repression" (or, "repressive intolerance") as the second type of structural violence.

Lastly, Galtung notes that repression need not be violence associated with repressive regimes or declared on particular documents to be human-rights infractions, as "there are other types of damage done to the human mind not included in that particular tradition." From this sense, he categorizes alienation (i.e., "deprival of higher needs") as the fourth type of violence, leading to the third kind of structural violence, "structurally conditioned alienation"—or, "repressive tolerance," in that it is repressive but also compatible with repression, a lower level of structural violence.

Since structural violence is avoidable, he argues, structural violence is a high cause of premature death and unnecessary disability.

Some examples of structural violence as proposed by Galtung include institutionalized adultism, ageism, classism, elitism, ethnocentrism, nationalism, speciesism, racism, and sexism. Structural violence and direct violence are said to be highly interdependent, including family violence, gender violence, hate crimes, racial violence, police violence, state violence, terrorism, and war.

Others 
In his book Violence: Reflections on a National Epidemic, James Gilligan defines structural violence as "the increased rates of death and disability suffered by those who occupy the bottom rungs of society, as contrasted with the relatively lower death rates experienced by those who are above them." Gilligan largely describes these "excess deaths" as "non-natural" and attributes them to the stress, shame, discrimination, and denigration that results from lower status. He draws on Richard Sennett and Jonathan Cobb (i.e., The Hidden Injuries of Class, 1973), who examine the "contest for dignity" in a context of dramatic inequality.

In her interdisciplinary textbook on violence, Bandy X. Lee wrote "Structural violence refers to the avoidable limitations that society places on groups of people that constrain them from meeting their basic needs and achieving the quality of life that would otherwise be possible. These limitations, which can be political, economic, religious, cultural, or legal in nature, usually originate in institutions that exercise power over particular subjects." She goes on to say that "[it] is therefore an illustration of a power system wherein social structures or institutions cause harm to people in a way that results in maldevelopment and other deprivations."

Rather than the term being called social injustice or oppression, there is an advocacy for it to be called violence because this phenomenon comes from, and can be corrected by, human decisions, rather than just natural causes.

Cause and effects 
In The Sources of Social Power (1986), Michael Mann makes the argument that within state formation, "increased organizational power is a trade-off, whereby the individual obtains more security and food in exchange for his or her freedom."

Siniša Malešević elaborates on Mann's argument: "Mann's point needs extending to cover all social organizations, not just the state. The early chiefdoms were not states, obviously; still, they were established on a similar basis—an inversely proportional relationship between security and resources, on the one hand, and liberty, on the other." This means that, although those who live in organized, centralized social systems are not likely subject to hunger or to die in an animal attack, they are likely to engage in organized violence, which could include war. These structures make for opportunities and advances that humans could not create for themselves, including the development of agriculture, technology, philosophy, science, and art; however, these structures take tolls elsewhere, making them both productive and detrimental. In early human history, hunter-gatherer groups used organizational power to acquire more resources and produce more food; yet, at the same time, this power was also used to dominate, kill, and enslave other groups in order to expand territory and supplies.

Although structural violence is said to be invisible, it has a number of influences that shape it. These include identifiable institutions, relationships, force fields, and ideologies, including discriminatory laws, gender inequality, and racism. Moreover, this does not solely exist for those of lower classes, though the effects are much heavier on them, including higher rates of disease and death, unemployment, homelessness, lack of education, powerlessness, and shared fate of miseries. The whole social order is affected by social power; other, higher-class groups, however have much more indirect effects on them, with the acts generally being less violent.

Due to social and economic structures in place today—specifically divisions into rich and poor, powerful and weak, and superior and inferior—the excess premature death rate is between 10 and 20 million per year, which is over ten times the death rates from suicide, homicide, and warfare combined.

The work of Yale-based German philosopher, Thomas Pogge, is one major resource on the connection between structural violence and poverty, especially his book World Poverty and Human Rights (2002).

Access to health care
Structural violence affects the availability of health care insofar as paying attention to broad social forces (racism, gender inequality, classism, etc.) can determine who falls ill and who will be given access to care. It is therefore considered more likely for structural violence to occur in areas where biosocial methods are neglected in a country's health care system. Since situations of structural violence are viewed primarily as biological consequences, it neglects problems stimulated by people's environment, such as negative social behaviours or the prominence of inequality, therefore ineffectively addressing the issue.

Medical anthropologist Paul Farmer argues that the major flaw in the dominant model of medical care in the US is that medical services are sold as a commodity, remaining only available to those who can afford them. As medical professionals are not trained to understand the social forces behind disease, nor are they trained to deal with or alter them, they consequently have to ignore the social determinants that alter access to care. As a result, medical interventions are significantly less effective in low-income areas. Similarly, many areas and even countries cannot afford to stop the harmful cycle of structural violence.

The lack of training has, for example, had a significant impact on diagnosis and treatment of AIDS in the United States. A 1994 study by Moore et al. found that black Americans had a significantly lesser chance of receiving treatment than white Americans. Findings from another study suggest that the increased rate of workplace injury among undocumented Latino immigrants in the United States can also be understood as an example of structural violence.

If biosocial understandings are forsaken when considering communicable diseases such as HIV, for example, prevention methods and treatment practices become inadequate and unsustainable for populations. Farmer therefore also states that structural forces account for most if not all epidemic diseases.

Structural violence also exists in the area of mental health, where systems ignore the lived experiences of patients when making decisions about services and funding without consulting with the ill, including those who are illiterate, cannot access computers, do not speak the dominant language, are homeless, are too unwell to fill out long formal surveys, or are in locked psychiatric and forensic wards. Structural violence is also apparent when consumers in developed countries die from preventable diseases 15–25 years earlier than those without a lived experience of mental health.

Solutions 
Farmer ultimately claims that "structural interventions" are one possible solution to such violence. However, for structural interventions to be successful, medical professionals need to be capable of executing such tasks; as stated above, though, many of professionals are not trained to do so. Medical professionals still continue to operate with a focus on individual lifestyle factors rather than general socio-economic, cultural, and environmental conditions. This paradigm is considered by Farmer to obscure the structural impediments to changes because it tends to avoid the root causes that should be focused on instead.

Moreover, medical professionals can rightly note that structural interventions are not their job, and as result, continue to operate under conventional clinical intervention. Therefore, the onus falls more on political and other experts to implement such structural changes. One response is to incorporate medical professionals and to acknowledge that such active structural interventions are necessary to address real public health issues.

Countries such as Haiti and Rwanda, however, have implemented (with positive outcomes) structural interventions, including prohibiting the commodification of the citizen needs (such as health care); ensuring equitable access to effective therapies; and developing social safety nets. Such initiatives increase the social and economic rights of citizens, thus decreasing structural violence.

The successful examples of structural interventions in these countries have shown to be fundamental.

Although the interventions have enormous influence on economical and political aspects of international bodies, more interventions are needed to improve access.

Although health disparities resulting from social inequalities are possible to reduce, as long as health care is exchanged as a commodity, those without the power to purchase it will have less access to it. Biosocial research should therefore be the main focus, while sociology can better explain the origin and spread of infectious diseases, such as HIV or AIDS. For instance, research shows that the risk of HIV is highly affected by one's behavior and habits. As such, despite some structural interventions being able to decrease premature morbidity and mortality, the social and historical determinants of the structural violence cannot be omitted.

Cultural violence
Cultural violence refers to aspects of a culture that can be used to justify or legitimize direct or structural violence, and may be exemplified by religion & ideology, language & art, and empirical science & formal science.

Cultural violence makes both direct and structural violence look or feel 'right', or at least not wrong, according to Galtung. The study of cultural violence highlights the ways the act of direct violence and the fact of structural violence are legitimized and thus made acceptable in society. Galtung explains that one mechanism of cultural violence is to change the "moral color" of an act from "red/wrong" to "green/right," or at least to "yellow/acceptable."

International scope

Petra Kelly wrote in her first book, Fighting for Hope (1984):

The violence in structural violence is attributed to the specific organizations of society that injure or harm individuals or masses of individuals. In explaining his point of view on how structural violence affects the health of subaltern or marginalized people, medical anthropologist Paul Farmer writes:

This perspective has been continually discussed by Farmer, as well as by Philippe Bourgois and Nancy Scheper-Hughes. Farmer ultimately claims that "structural interventions" are one possible solution to such violence; structural violence is the result of policy and social structures, and change can only be a product of altering the processes that encourage structural violence in the first place.

Theorists argue that structural violence is embedded in the current world system; this form of violence, which is centered on apparently inequitable social arrangements, is not inevitable. Ending the global problem of structural violence will require actions that may seem unfeasible in the short term. To some, this indicates that it may be easier to devote resources to minimizing the harmful impacts of structural violence. Others, such as futurist Wendell Bell, see a need for long-term vision to guide projects for social justice. Many structural violences, such as racism and sexism, have become such a common occurrence in society that they appear almost invisible. Despite this fact, sexism and racism have been the focus of intense cultural and political resistance for many decades. Significant reform has been accomplished, though the project remains incomplete.

Farmer notes that there are three reasons why structural violence is hard to see:

 Suffering is exoticized—that is, when something/someone is distant or far away, individuals tend to not be affected by it. When suffering lacks proximity, it's easy to exoticise.
 The weight of suffering is also impossible to comprehend. There is simply no way that many individuals are able to comprehend what suffering is like.
 Lastly, the dynamics and distribution of suffering are still poorly understood.

Anthropologist Seth Holmes studied suffering through the lens of structural violence in his 2013 ethnography Fresh Fruit Broken Bodies: Migrant Farmworkers in the United States. He analyzed the naturalization of physical and mental suffering, violence continuum, and structural vulnerability experienced by Mexican migrants in the U.S. in their everyday lives. Holmes used examples like governmental influences of structural violence—such as how American subsidization of corn industries force Mexican farmers out of business, thereby forcing them to make the very dangerous trip across the border, where the U.S. Border Patrol hinder these migrants' chances of finding work in America, and the impact this all has on the migrants’ bodies.

See also

 Aggression
 Cultural reproduction
 Civil Rights Movement
 Cycle of poverty
 Economic violence
 Global inequality 
 Global policeman 
 Imperialism
 Institutional racism
 Lawsuit
 Monetarism 
 Neoconservativism
 Neoliberalism  
 Red Scare
 Political violence
 Social inequality
 Social murder
 Structural abuse
 Symbolic violence
 War on Drugs
 Washington consensus

Footnotes

Further reading
 Galtung, Johan. 1969. "Violence, Peace, and Peace Research." Journal of Peace Research 6(3):167–91.
Gilman, Robert. 1983. "Structural violence: Can we find genuine peace in a world with inequitable distribution of wealth among nations?" In Context 4(Autumn 1983):8–8.
Henderson, Sophie. 2019. "State-Sanctioned Structural Violence: Women Migrant Domestic Workers in the Philippines and Sri Lanka." Violence Against Women 26(12-13):1598–615. .
Ho, Kathleen. 2007. "Structural Violence as a Human Rights Violation." Essex Human Rights Review 4(2). .

1969 neologisms
Violence
Sociological terminology
Social systems